Elongation factors are a set of proteins that function at the ribosome, during protein synthesis, to facilitate translational elongation from the formation of the first to the last peptide bond of a growing polypeptide. Most common elongation factors in prokaryotes are EF-Tu, EF-Ts, EF-G. Bacteria and eukaryotes use elongation factors that are largely homologous to each other, but with distinct structures and different research nomenclatures.

Elongation is the most rapid step in translation. In bacteria, it proceeds at a rate of 15 to 20 amino acids added per second (about 45-60 nucleotides per second). In eukaryotes the rate is about two amino acids per second (about 6 nucleotides read per second). Elongation factors play a role in orchestrating the events of this process, and in ensuring the high accuracy translation at these speeds.

Nomenclature of homologous EFs

In addition to their cytoplasmic machinery, eukaryotic mitochondria and plastids have their own translation machinery, each with their own set of bacterial-type elongation factors. In humans, they include TUFM, TSFM, GFM1, GFM2, GUF1; the nominal release factor MTRFR may also play a role in elongation.

In bacteria, selenocysteinyl-tRNA requires a special elongation factor SelB related to EF-Tu. A few homologs are also found in archaea, but the functions are unknown.

As a target 
Elongation factors are targets for the toxins of some pathogens. For instance, Corynebacterium diphtheriae produces diphtheria toxin, which alters protein function in the host by inactivating elongation factor (EF-2). This results in the pathology and symptoms associated with Diphtheria. Likewise, Pseudomonas aeruginosa exotoxin A inactivates EF-2.

References

Further reading
Alberts, B. et al. (2002). Molecular Biology of the Cell, 4th ed. New York: Garland Science. .
Berg, J. M. et al. (2002). Biochemistry, 5th ed. New York: W.H. Freeman and Company. .
Singh, B. D. (2002). Fundamentals of Genetics, New Delhi, India: Kalyani Publishers. .

External links
 nobelprize.org Explaining the function of eukaryotic elongation factors
 
 
 
 

Protein biosynthesis